The 2015 Competition102 GT4 European Series season was the eighth season of the GT4 European Series, a sports car championship created and organised by the Stéphane Ratel Organisation (SRO). The season began on 5 April at Circuit Paul Armagnac, and finished on 4 October at Misano World Circuit after six race weekends.

V8 Racing duo Marcel Nooren and Jelle Beelen won the GT4 Pro championship by 24 points ahead of their nearest competitor, Duncan Huisman. Nooren and Beelen won races at Nogaro and the Red Bull Ring, as well as taking a total of ten podium finishes from the twelve races. Huisman was a three-time race winner, sharing one victory with Luc Braams and two with Sandor van Es. Third place in the Pro championship standings went to Peter Ebner and Sascha Halek, who also won three races during the season. The other Pro class wins were shared between Carsten Struwe and Peter Terting (sweeping the Nürburgring round), while the pairings of Bernhard van Oranje and Ricardo van der Ende (Racing Team Holland by Ekris Motorsport), and Marcus Clutton and Jordan Witt (Chevron Cars) each took one victory. The GT4 Amateur class title was taken by ZaWotec driver Daniel Uckermann by 19 points ahead of Pavel Lefterov for ASC Bulavto Racing. Uckermann and Lefterov each took four victories, with Liesette Braams, André Grammatico, Håkan Ricknäs and Patrick Zamparini and Barrie Baxter each taking one victory during 2015.

Calendar
On 5 December 2014, a six-round calendar was announced for the 2015 season, with races in support of the Blancpain Sprint Series, the ADAC GT Masters and the Spa 24 Hours. On 27 February 2015, it was announced that the round, scheduled to support Spa 24 Hours, would be moved to June, and in support of the ADAC GT Masters.

Entry list

Race calendar and results

Footnotes

References

External links

GT4 European Series
GT4 European Series
GT4 European Series